DeQuan Menzie (born January 11, 1990) is a former American football cornerback. He played college football at Alabama.

High school career
Menzie played high school football at Carver High School in Columbus, Georgia, where he played under coach Dell McGee. Menzie led Caver to the 2007 GHSA AAA state championship.

College career
Menzie attended Copiah-Lincoln Community College in 2008 and 2009. He transferred to the University of Alabama in 2010. As a senior in 2011, he was an AFCA first-team All-American and was a member of the Crimson Tide team that beat LSU in the 2012 BCS National Championship Game.

Professional career

Kansas City Chiefs
Menzie was drafted by the Kansas City Chiefs in the 5th round, 146 overall pick in the 2012 NFL Draft The Chiefs released him on May 13, 2013.

Detroit Lions
The Detroit Lions claimed Menzie off waivers on May 15, 2013. He was released as part of final cuts on August 27, 2013.

Carolina Panthers
The Carolina Panthers signed Menzie to a reserve/future contract January 3, 2014. He was released by the Panthers on July 26, 2014 and announced his retirement the next day.

References

External links
Alabama Crimson Tide bio
Detroit Lions bio

1990 births
Living people
Alabama Crimson Tide football players
American football cornerbacks
American football safeties
Carolina Panthers players
Copiah-Lincoln Wolfpack football players
Detroit Lions players
Kansas City Chiefs players
Players of American football from Columbus, Georgia